Munmorah, an electoral district of the Legislative Assembly in the Australian state of New South Wales was created in 1973 and abolished in 1981.


Election results

1978

1976

1973

References

New South Wales state electoral results by district